"Hunger" is one of the best known poems by the internationally acclaimed Indian English poet Jayanta Mahapatra. The poem is widely anthologised in most important modern Indian poetry collections and is the most widely analysed piece among his works. The poem explores the informal child sex trade lurking in the social fabric, and is unique in its bold treatment of sexuality unlike a typical poem by him.

Origin
The poem was originally a part of the poet's collection A Rain of Rites.

In the poet's own words, the poem is based on a direct real-life experience. But it is not clear whether the poet as the protagonist was the visitor to the fisherman's daughter. The poem is an expression of the poet's loneliness as a youth, as Mahapatra had a disturbed childhood.

Structure and criticism
The poem is notable for its directness in approaching the taboo topic of the sexual trade involving a father and his daughter. In the second line, the fisherman asks casually "will you have her?". However, the exact intention of the father is couched in subtle and ambivalent imagery:- "trailing his nets and nerves" and "his white bone thrashing his eyes". A wide range of poetic devices are employed to bring out the mind's trappings in the flesh.

The vivid imagery of the seashore in the poem depicts the circumstances that compel a woman to sell her body through prostitution. Some commentators have pointed out the brutal treatment of sexuality in the poem.

See also
Indian poetry
Indian writing in English

Notes

External links
Popular Indian Poems

English-language poems
Indian poems
1976 poems
Indian English poems